The Croatian Athletics Federation is the governing body for the sport of athletics in Croatia.

It was founded in 1992 after Croatia had announced independence from the Socialist Federal Republic of Yugoslavia.

Medalists at Olympic Games

Medalists at World Championship

Medalists at European Championship

Medalists at World Indoor Championship

Medalists at European Indoor Championship

World Athletics annual series of competitions Winners

Diamond League
Field disciplines
Sandra Perković - 6 times
Blanka Vlašić - 2 times

References

External links
 Official site

Croatia
Sports organizations established in 1992
Athletics
Athletics in Croatia
1992 establishments in Croatia
National governing bodies for athletics